Remixes 98–2000 is a 2000 album released by The Cinematic Orchestra. It is a remix album, and the tracks are a combination of songs recorded by the band, remixed by other people and songs by other people, remixed by The Cinematic Orchestra.

Track listing
 "Moving Cities (The Cinematic Orchestra remix)" - Faze Action  – 7:50
 "Channel 1 Suite (Tom Tyler remix)" - The Cinematic Orchestra  – 5:15
 "The Fear Theme (The Cinematic Orchestra's Re-interpretation)" - Kenji Eno  – 5:48
 "Guauanco (The Cinematic Orchestra's Extended version)" - Les Gammas  – 7:35
 "Panoramica (The Cinematic Orchestra remix)" - Piero Umiliani  – 6:27
 "Vilderness (The Cinematic Orchestra remix)" - Nils Petter Molvær  – 6:21
 "Re-Arrange (The Cinematic Orchestra remix)" - DJ Krust  – 9:48
The vinyl release of the album included one additional track:
 "Ode To The Big Lizard (The Cinematic Orchestra Chameleon mix)" - Tom Tyler

External links
Ninja Tune official website
Cinematic Orchestra official website

The Cinematic Orchestra albums
2000 remix albums
Ninja Tune remix albums